DWCN (96.9 FM) Radyo Pilipinas is a radio station owned and operated by the Provincial Government of Camarines Norte. Its studios and transmitter are located at Brgy. III, Daet.

References

Radio stations in Camarines Norte